Surf Air is a Los Angeles-based aviation marketplace that offers members access to private charter flights for a fixed monthly fee.

Service areas
As of March 2019, the company serves five California airports: Hawthorne (HHR), Oakland (OAK), San Carlos (SQL), Santa Barbara (SBA), and Truckee (TRK).

In June 2017, Surf Air expanded service into Texas with its acquisition of RISE, a Texas-based air travel provider. They service flights to and from Austin Bergstrom, San Antonio International, Dallas Love Field, Houston Hobby, and David Wayne Hooks in Northwest Houston. Dallas entrepreneur Nick Kennedy, who founded RISE, was expected to serve as president of the Texas and southeast region for Surf Air. The former RISE routes have since been transitioned to be operated by Tradewind Aviation instead of in-house.

In July 2017, Surf Air started operations in Europe, debuting its maiden trip from London to Ibiza. Surf Air Europe operated under the same subscription model where customers pay a monthly fee starting from £1,750 ($2,180) for unlimited travel. Surf Air would start with flights from London to Zurich during the week and to Ibiza in Spain at weekends. It had plans to add routes to Cannes, Munich, Luxembourg, and Milan. Surf Air Europe had one Embraer Phenom 300 private jet in its fleet. In October 2017, Surf Air began offering a membership that provides all-you-can-fly in both the European and US networks for £3,150. The company planned to feature dozens more aircraft within the next three to five years. However, in March 2018, Surf Air Europe went into liquidation in December 2018.

History
The company was founded by David Eyerly, Wade Eyerly, Peter Bi, Scott Porter, Cory Cozzens, and Reed Farnsworth. Surf Air emerged in 2012 from MuckerLab, a Los Angeles-based business incubator. Angel investors included Paige Craig, Aviv Grill, and Bill Woodward. The Series A round of venture capital was completed in June 2013 with investment from Anthem Venture Partners, NEA, TriplePoint Capital, Siemer Ventures, Baroda Ventures, Gilad Elbaz, Eytan Elbaz, Rick Caruso, Jeffrey Stibel, Mike Walsh, and actor Jared Leto. The company raised at least $9 million from investors, including $500,000 from VegasTechFund (a venture capital fund launched by Tony Hsieh), Velos Partners, and Base Ventures.

In February 2014, Wade Eyerly stepped down as CEO and was replaced by former Frontier Airlines CEO Jeff Potter. At the time, the company had about 430 members. After Surf Air, Wade Eyerly, Cory Cozzens, and Reed Farnsworth formed Beacon Air in 2015, but shut it down in 2016. In August 2014, Surf Air raised $8 million in new equity funding and secured a $65 million loan to place a five-year order for 15 new Pilatus PC-12 planes, with an option to buy 50 more over that timespan. In May 2016, Surf Air received 2 additional aircraft phasing out their older legacy PC-12s. 

Surf Air announced the sale of its 2,000th membership in September 2015, 2,500th in December 2015, and 3,000th in June 2016. As of October 2017, it had 5,000 customers.
As of 2017, membership charges started from $1,950 per month plus a $1,000 signup fee. In February 2018, Surf Air launched on-demand charter enabling customers to charter the entire aircraft, including airplanes not in the Surf Air fleet. In October 2018, Surf Air announced Surf Air Express, a new membership program targeting less frequent travelers with an annual membership fee and payments for each flight.

On May 16, 2017, Surf Air flight operations were transitioned to Encompass Aviation. Sudhin Shahani took over as Chief Executive of Surf Air in 2017 after Jeff Potter exited. When Encompass took over of all Surf Air operations, it retained all Surf Air's pilots and aircraft. Encompass is based in Hawthorne, California and is a FAA Part 135 operator. In June 2018, it was reported the IRS had put liens totaling nearly $2.5 million against Surf Air for unpaid federal excise tax. At the same time, Surf Air said it was changing operators for California flights to Advanced Air Charter from Encompass. Encompass stated the Surf Air was behind on payments due for operating flights for Surf Air.

Surf Air Europe, established in 2017 as the European branch, went into liquidation in December 2018. Customers lost $272,000 in deposits and membership fees, according to final accounts from the liquidation. 

In February 2020, announced the acquisition of Blackbird. CEO Shahani hopes that BlackBird’s digital platform will allow Surf Air to expand its reach without buying more planes.

In February 2021, Surf Air announced the acquisition of Ampaire which has been developing a hybrid-electric power train in Cessna aircraft. In 2021, Surf Air plans to continue to expand its roster of destinations. For the last year prior to August 2021, Surf Air has expanded from seven to 23 destinations with several more on the way. In 2022, Surf Air continued to see month-to-month increases in flights and passenger count.
In April 2022, Surf Air Mobility abandoned its $100 million acquisition of Ampaire.

Fleet 

, the Surf Air fleet consists of the following aircraft:

Certification 
Surf Air does not own or operate any aircraft. All flights arranged by Surf Air for its members are performed by independent, third party FAA-licensed and DOT-registered air carriers.

Noise complaints 
In 2017, residents from the San Francisco Bay Area complained of excessive noise at San Carlos Airport caused by Surf Air. They formed a group named Calm The Skies. San Mateo County acknowledged the noise issue caused by Surf Air. Part of the County solution was to introduce an arrival procedure called "Bayside Visual Approach" that underwent testing in 2016 which shifts flights and noise from San Mateo County to the city of Sunnyvale in neighboring Santa Clara County. A curfew has also been discussed in addition to other measures to mitigate the noise.

References

External links

 

Airlines based in California
Airlines established in 2013
Companies based in Santa Monica, California
2013 establishments in California
Subscription services
Aircraft leasing companies
American companies established in 2013